Mary Holland (born 1985) is American actress and comedian.

Mary Holland may also refer to:
Mary Holland (activist) (before 1900—after 1940), Irish anti-treaty supporter
Mary Holland (journalist) (1935–2004), Irish journalist

Mary Holland (b.1933), English actress, perhaps best remembered as "Katie" in many Oxo commercials (1958–76)
Mary A. Gardner Holland (before 1840—after 1898), Union nurse during the American Civil War
Mary E. Holland (1868–1915), American detective and fingerprint expert
Mary Jane Holland (c. 1840—after 1858), first love of George Armstrong Custer
"Mary Jane Holland", song by Lady Gaga from her 2013 album Artpop

See also
Maria Elizabeth Holland (1836–1878), South African botanical artist and plant collector
Mary Fox, Baroness Holland (1746–1778), British baroness
Mary Holland Kinkaid (1861–1948), American novelist and journalist

Holland, Mary